Begum Khaleda Zia: Her Life, Her Story is a biography written by journalist Mahfuz Ullah on the politics of former Prime Minister of Bangladesh Begum Khaleda Zia and various events in her life. The book was published in English on November 18, 2018. This is the latest biography published by the author.

Background
The book depicts the events of Khaleda Zia's colorful political life, foresight and struggle. The book also covers some of the events leading up to the last days of the 2007 military-backed caretaker government. The book describes how Khaleda Khanam Putul, born in 1945 in Dinajpur, became the wife of army officer Ziaur Rahman, how she left the responsibility of housewife after her husband's death and took over the responsibility of Bangladesh Nationalist Party and how she became the leader of the country.

Index
 Acknowledgement
 By The Way An Introduction
 Chapter 1 - Dinajpur to Dhaka
 Chapter 2 - The Journey Beguins
 Chapter 3 - The New Saviour
 Chapter 4 - Making of A Leader
 Chapter 5 - The Year of Consolidation
 Chapter 6 - The Politics of Duplicity
 Chapter 7 - The New Terms of Politics
 Chapter 8 - The Fight Goes On
 Chapter 9 - New Polarisation
 Chapter 10 - The Fail of Ershad
 Chapter 11 - Intro The Corridor of Power
 Chapter 12 - The Opposition Show It's Teeth
 Chapter 13 - The Browning Storm
 Chapter 14 - The Failed Jatiyo Sangsad
 Chapter 15 - The Losing Battle
 Chapter 16 - Street Power Scatales Democracy
 Chapter 17 - The Revolt of Beurrocat and A Failed Cop

References

External links
 Open Library

Women in Bangladesh